The 2019–20 Southern Counties East Football League season was the 54th in the history of the Southern Counties East Football League, a football competition in England, and the fourth year the competition had two divisions, the Premier Division and Division One.

The allocations for Steps 1 to 6 for season 2019–20 were announced by the FA on 19 May. These were subject to appeal, and the Southern Counties East's constitution was ratified at the league's AGM on 22 June.

As a result of the COVID-19 pandemic, this season's competition was formally abandoned on 26 March 2020, with all results from the season being expunged, and no promotion or relegation taking place to, from, or within the competition. On 30 March 2020, sixty-six non-league clubs sent an open letter to the Football Association requesting that they reconsider their decision.

Premier Division

The Premier Division consisted of 17 clubs from the previous season along with three new clubs:
 Erith & Belvedere, promoted from Division One
 Greenwich Borough, relegated from the Isthmian League
 Welling Town, promoted from Division One

League table

Division One

Division One consisted of 15 clubs from the previous season along with two new clubs, relegated from the Premier Division:
 Croydon
 Rusthall

League table

References

External links
 Southern Counties East Football League Official Website

2019–20
9
Association football events curtailed and voided due to the COVID-19 pandemic